Nuclear strategy involves the development of doctrines and strategies for the production and use of nuclear weapons.

As a sub-branch of military strategy, nuclear strategy attempts to match nuclear weapons as means to political ends. In addition to the actual use of nuclear weapons whether in the battlefield or strategically, a large part of nuclear strategy involves their use as a bargaining tool.

Some of the issues considered within nuclear strategy include:

Conditions which serve a nation's interest to develop nuclear weapons
Types of nuclear weapons to be developed
How and when weapons are to be used

Many strategists argue that nuclear strategy differs from other forms of military strategy. The immense and terrifying power of the weapons makes their use, in seeking victory in a traditional military sense, impossible.

Perhaps counterintuitively, an important focus of nuclear strategy has been determining how to prevent and deter their use, a crucial part of mutual assured destruction.

In the context of nuclear proliferation and maintaining the balance of power, states also seek to prevent other states from acquiring nuclear weapons as part of nuclear strategy.

Nuclear deterrent composition
The doctrine of mutual assured destruction (MAD) assumes that a nuclear deterrent force must be credible and survivable. That is, each deterrent force must survive a first strike with sufficient capability to effectively destroy the other country in a second strike. Therefore, a first strike would be suicidal for the launching country.

In the late 1940s and 1950s as the Cold War developed, the United States and Soviet Union pursued multiple delivery methods and platforms to deliver nuclear weapons. Three types of platforms proved most successful and are collectively called a "nuclear triad". These are air-delivered weapons (bombs or missiles), ballistic missile submarines (usually nuclear-powered and called SSBNs), and intercontinental ballistic missiles (ICBMs), usually deployed in land-based hardened missile silos or on vehicles.

Although not considered part of the deterrent forces, all of the nuclear powers deployed large numbers of tactical nuclear weapons in the Cold War. These could be delivered by virtually all platforms capable of delivering large conventional weapons.

During the 1970s there was growing concern that the combined conventional forces of the Soviet Union and the Warsaw Pact could overwhelm the forces of NATO.  It seemed unthinkable to respond to a Soviet/Warsaw Pact incursion into Western Europe with strategic nuclear weapons, inviting a catastrophic exchange.  Thus, technologies were developed to greatly reduce collateral damage while being effective against advancing conventional military forces.  Some of these were low-yield neutron bombs, which were lethal to tank crews, especially with tanks massed in tight formation, while producing relatively little blast, thermal radiation, or radioactive fallout.  Other technologies were so-called "suppressed radiation devices," which produced mostly blast with little radioactivity, making them much like conventional explosives, but with much more energy.

See also 

 Assured destruction
 Bernard Brodie
 Counterforce, Countervalue
 Decapitation strike
 Deterrence theory
 Doctrine for Joint Nuclear Operations
 Dr. Strangelove (1964), a film by Stanley Kubrick, satirizing nuclear strategy.
 Fail-deadly
 First strike, Second strike
 Force de frappe
 Game theory & wargaming
 Herman Kahn
 Madman theory
 Massive retaliation
 Military strategy
 Minimal deterrence
 Mutual assured destruction (MAD)
 No first use
 National Security Strategy of the United States
 Nuclear blackmail
 Nuclear proliferation
 Nuclear utilization target selection (NUTS)
 Nuclear weapons debate
 Single Integrated Operational Plan (SIOP)
 Strategic bombing
 Tactical nuclear weapons
 Thomas Schelling

Bibliography

Early texts
 Brodie, Bernard. The Absolute Weapon. Freeport, N.Y.: Books for Libraries Press, 1946.
 Brodie, Bernard. Strategy in the Missile Age. Princeton: Princeton University Press, 1959.
 Dunn, Lewis A. Deterrence Today – Roles, Challenges, and Responses Paris: IFRI Proliferation Papers n° 19, 2007.
 Kahn, Herman. On Thermonuclear War. 2nd ed. Princeton, N.J.: Princeton University Press, 1961.
 Kissinger, Henry A. Nuclear Weapons and Foreign Policy. New York: Harper, 1957.
 Schelling, Thomas C. Arms and Influence. New Haven: Yale University Press, 1966.
 Wohlstetter, Albert. "The Delicate Balance of Terror." Foreign Affairs 37, 211 (1958): 211–233.

Secondary literature
 Baylis, John, and John Garnett. Makers of Nuclear Strategy. London: Pinter, 1991.  .
 Buzan, Barry, and Herring, Eric. "The Arms Dynamic in World Politics". London: Lynne Rienner Publishers, 1998. .
 Freedman, Lawrence. The Evolution of Nuclear Strategy. 2nd ed. New York: St. Martin's Press, 1989.   .
 Heuser, Beatrice. NATO, Britain, France and the FRG: Nuclear Strategies and Forces for Europe, 1949–2000 (London: Macmillan, hardback 1997, paperback 1999), 256p., 
 Heuser, Beatrice. Nuclear Mentalities?  Strategies and Belief Systems in Britain, France and the FRG (London: Macmillan, July 1998), 277p., Index, Tables. 
 Heuser, Beatrice. "Victory in a Nuclear War? A Comparison of NATO and WTO War Aims and Strategies", Contemporary European History Vol. 7 Part 3 (November 1998), pp. 311–328.
 Heuser, Beatrice. "Warsaw Pact Military Doctrines in the 70s and 80s: Findings in the East German Archives", Comparative Strategy Vol. 12 No. 4 (Oct.–Dec. 1993), pp. 437–457.
 Kaplan, Fred M. The Wizards of Armageddon. New York: Simon and Schuster, 1983.  .
 Rai Chowdhuri, Satyabrata.  Nuclear Politics: Towards A Safer World, Ilford: New Dawn Press, 2004.
 Rosenberg, David. "The Origins of Overkill: Nuclear Weapons and American Strategy, 1945–1960." International Security 7, 4 (Spring, 1983): 3–71.
 Schelling, Thomas C. The Strategy of Conflict. Cambridge: Harvard University Press, 1960.
 Smoke, Richard. National Security and the Nuclear Dilemma. 3rd ed. New York: McGraw–Hill, 1993.  .

References 

 
Nuclear warfare